Milk Makeup is a New York City-based cosmetics and skin care company created by the founders of Milk Studios. Despite its name, it is 100% vegan.

History 
Milk Makeup was launched in February 2016 and was founded in New York City by Milk Studios co-founder Mazdack Rassi, fashion editor, and entertainment reporter Zanna Roberts Rassi, creative director Georgie Greville and product developer Dianna Ruth. Media executive Scott Sassa serves as chairman.

The company's products were initially distributed by Sephora. In 2017, the company received an investment from Main Post Partners.

Products 
Milk Makeup began with a lineup of 85 SKUs including lipsticks and blotting papers. They also have products for men. This attracts a vast number of customers to the brand, as well as to their social media community. On their Instagram account, followed by over 1.2 million users, they refer to their customers as "Milk Mob", creating a tightly knit community where Instagram followers can be exposed to exclusive videos, product announcements, and campaign photos. The brand is present on several other platforms as well, including Twitter and YouTube.

The brand gained attention in the online beauty community, following the release of a cannabis oil-infused mascara, the KUSH mascara. The ingredient is promoted as a lash conditioner and has since been included in a multitude of products, within the brand's 'KUSH' line.

In November 2018, Milk Makeup collaborated with Wu-Tang and TRUE NYC, to pay homage to their underground NYC roots and celebrate self-expression, strength, and the connection between them. The product is listed as antioxidant-rich sacred lotus water, cherry blossom, and ginseng combine as a shield to help protect against free radicals and fuel the life energy of the Wu Warrior.

Reception 
Milk Makeup has received praise from publications such as Vogue, Teen Vogue Vanity Fair, and InStyle Magazine. The company has also been noted for its use of 'atypical' models, such as Sabina Karlsson, and LGBT models.

Milk Makeup's “Holographic Stick” has won an Allure “Best of Beauty” award.

Its target demographic was described by Fast Company as millennials.

Milk Makeup supports the Fashion Scholarship Fund by donating 1% of all sales on milkmakeup.com.

References

Cosmetics companies of the United States
2016 establishments in New York City
American companies established in 2016
Companies based in New York City